Chinese High School may refer to:

Educations
 Chinese Independent High School, Malaysia
 Chinese school
 Education in the People's Republic of China

Schools
 Chinese High School (Batu Pahat), Malaysia
 Sabah Chinese High School, Tawau, Malaysia
 The Chinese High School (Singapore), Singapore